The National Museum of Theatre in Almagro (Ciudad Real), Spain is a museum dedicated to the promotion and preservation of Spanish theatre. It owns a large collection of scenic designs and scale models, costumes and costume designs, puppets, drawings, printmakings, paintings, sculptures, photographs, music recordings, programmes and documents from diverse Spanish theatres.

Gallery

References

Cultural tourism in Spain
National museums of Spain
Theatre museums
Museums in Castilla–La Mancha
Museums established in 1919
1919 establishments in Spain
Almagro, Ciudad Real